Dark Light is a science fiction novel by Scottish writer Ken MacLeod, published in 2001.
It is the second book in the Engines of Light Trilogy and a 2002 nominee for the Campbell Award.

The novel continues the plot from Cosmonaut Keep, but this time is set on the "Second Sphere", a number of clustered solar systems artificially seeded with intelligent life forms by a mysterious and transcendent alien species. Within this system, the main character, Matt Cairns, develops a form of interstellar travel and sets out to discover the motivation of the aliens.

Literary significance and reception
Publishers Weekly had a mixed review for the novel saying:

References

External links

 Dark Light at Worlds Without End

2001 British novels
2001 science fiction novels
Libertarian science fiction books
Novels about extraterrestrial life
Novels by Ken MacLeod
Orbit Books books